Paul Townsend is a British physicist.

Paul Towns(h)end may also refer to:
Paul Townsend, guitarist for Hundred Reasons
Paul Townsend, performer at Knott's Berry Farm's Wild West Stunt show
Paul Townshend, musician, brother of Pete Townshend